Eli Mathieu Tchaoussou Adoassou (born 11 November 1993), known as Mathieu Adoassou, is a Chadian professional footballer who plays as a goalkeeper for Chad Premier League club Renaissance FC and the Chad national team.

References 

1993 births
Living people
People from N'Djamena
Chadian footballers
Association football goalkeepers
Foullah Edifice FC players
Renaissance FC players
AS CotonTchad players
Chad Premier League players
Chad international footballers